Andrew Lewis (born 30 November 1989 in Port of Spain) is a Trinidadian sailor. He competed at the 2012 Summer Olympics in the Men's Laser class. He also competed in the same class at the 2011 Pan American Games, and the 2015 Pan American Games, the 2016 Summer Olympics, and the 2020 Summer Olympics.

References

External links
 
 
 

1989 births
Living people
Trinidad and Tobago male sailors (sport)
Olympic sailors of Trinidad and Tobago
Sailors at the 2012 Summer Olympics – Laser
Sailors at the 2016 Summer Olympics – Laser
Sailors at the 2020 Summer Olympics – Laser
Pan American Games competitors for Trinidad and Tobago
Sailors at the 2011 Pan American Games
Sailors at the 2015 Pan American Games
Sportspeople from Port of Spain
Trinidad and Tobago people of European descent
Trinidad and Tobago people of Welsh descent
Trinidad and Tobago people of Barbadian descent
Trinidad and Tobago people of British descent